Alfred White may refer to:

 Alfred Holmes White (1872–1953), chemical engineer
 Alfred White (English cricketer) (1854–?), English cricketer
 Alfred White (Australian cricketer) (1879-1962), Australian cricketer
 Alfred White (politician) (1902–1987), Australian politician
Alfred Tredway White, American housing reformer and philanthropist
Alfred White of White and Poppe
Alfred White (zoologist); see James Scott Bowerbank
Alf White (gangster) (1887-1942), English gangster

See also
Alf Wight, British vet and writer
Alf Whyte, List of Worldwar characters
Al White (disambiguation)